Jared Ross McCloud (born June 24, 1980) is an American singer-songwriter, currently living in Maine. He had notable success with his record, Romance of the Atlantic, released on Sling Slang Records on May 22, 2009.

McCloud's style ranges from folk to alternative and he is known for playing intimate solo acoustic performances, or playing with a backing band that brings a rock and roll element to his music. He has been well received by both critics and fans, and continues to tour and write.

Early life
McCloud was born in Bedford, Texas. Shortly after he was born, his parents divorced and his mother took him and his brother to Connecticut, where she was born. McCloud would later claim that his musical influences came from his brother (who was listening to the 1980s metal) and his mother, an avid Motown fan ("It really depended on who I was in the car with- if I was with my brother it could be anything from Mötley Crüe to King Diamond. If I was in my Mom's car it was Marvin Gaye, The Temptations, Smokey Robinson...").

McCloud began playing guitar at age five when his brother put one in his hands. From there he would spend hours playing along with the radio and making up his own songs. He would go on to front many bands in his high school career, but they would all not last too long, as no one in the band would share McCloud's intensity.

Career
McCloud grew up playing in hard rock/heavy metal bands where he quickly stood out as a gifted guitar player. A lot of these bands would "fizzle out" rather quickly due to ever changing members and different musical tastes. One such band MERCY DROWNS did have some success, but when it seemed like the band might go somewhere, it fell apart. McCloud said it was this break up that made him want to have a solo career. "If I write everything, and name the band after me, then I don't have to start writing new songs if someone leaves... I can't break-up myself.".

McCloud began writing an album that would go on to be 1717 Vine St.. Self released in 2005, the album was "about a period in my life, from love lost and thinking it was the end of the world, to a friend of mine taking his life and realizing that my problems were not that bad". Recorded with session musicians, McCloud began playing all over his native Connecticut and New York trying to get the songs heard. This led to a bit of success, playing bigger and bigger stages until finally he was headlining regularly. Around this time Jared's musical tastes began to change and he was focused more and more on being able to be a better songwriter. "I wanted to be as honest with my songs as possible, not worry about how fast I was playing". Jared decided that he was going to break up his backing band (which by now had seen a few different members) and play solo-acoustic shows.

Jared began writing the songs that would lead to him being signed by indie label Sling Slang Records. The labels owner, George Engal said that Jared was "an extremely gifted songwriter, and his new record would prove just that". Recorded at Aliehn productions in Bristol, Connecticut, Romance of the Atlantic was a soundtrack to a short story that McCloud had written. The album quickly caught on at national and college radio across the country and received great reviews from online magazines, newspapers and music magazines nationwide. In 2010, McCloud embarked on his first headlining tour that took him from the Northeast to the Mid-West. More recently, he was sponsored by Alvarez Guitars, which have been his favorite acoustic for some time now, as well as Steve Clayton Pics, SIT Strings, FootBass, and Corona.

In September 2010, McCloud began work on a new collection of songs. Recording at Seventh Wave Studios in Harrisburg, Pennsylvania with record producer Jason Rubal (The Dresden Dolls), these songs would become the record known as Painful Words Of Loving Grace. "The title just describes what the record is about. As many great times that I have had since the last record, there have been some pretty rough times, as well as things that I decided I wanted to get off of my chest. My last record was sort of this grand, majestic love story and when it was done, I was and am proud of it, but the last thing I wanted to do was go make "Romance of the Atlantic: part II… I wanted to make something a little closer to what I had been feeling and thinking about. I wanted to have a sound that was a little more raw and stripped down, sort of dirty and pretty at the same time. The things I am talking about are things that I don’t really tell anyone, or things that are hard to say. This is a record of loss, uncertainty, beauty, decadence… it’s all there."

McCloud decided to release this new record himself on February 4, 2011 and put on two release party shows in Hartford, CT, and Portland, ME  to celebrate it. The Album was met with glowing praise from fans and critics alike, and found Jared playing with bigger names like Vertical Horizon, Candlebox, Civil Twilight, Tony Lucca, and Ernie Halter.

Later in November 2011, McCloud delivered on a promise to his fans- putting out a live "download-only" record on his website. Feels Like Home- Live From Portland, ME, was recorded at Slainte in Portland, ME- one of Jared's favorite places to play. The free 7 song download includes solo performances of some of McCloud's best known work, as well as a cover of Tom Waits's "Chocolate Jesus" (a crowd favorite for years, and one that fans had been asking for a recording of), and a new song "Hail Mary".

In August 2014, McCloud released "To Live And Die In Your Arms" on Noble Steed Music (Tony Lucca, Brendan James, Andrea Nardello). The record was partially crowd funded with a successful Kickstarter campaign, and reached No. 46 on the iTunes Top 200 Singer-Songwriter chart.

Discography
 1717 Vine St. (Self released) 2005
 Romance of the Atlantic (Sling Slang Records) 2009
 Painful Words of Loving Grace (Self released) 2011
 Feels Like Home: LIVE From Portland, ME (Self released) 2011
 To Live and Die In Your Arms (Noble Steed Music) 2014

Press 
Jared McCloud is that rare thing; an artist that just cannot be compared to any of his contemporaries. His musical spectrum is about as broad as it is possible to be as he encompasses practically every rock subgenre you can imagine. I would say that he is a talent and that this album is not far off astonishing but that wouldn't even begin to do him justice.
— John Edden, AltSounds.com (March 17, 2011)

Imagine for a moment. all of that speaker-blowing intensity turned inward, shredding the artist down till there is nothing lift of him but the purity of his being. That's what this album is. Painful Words Of Loving Grace is raw and real, you can hear the scrape of flesh across steel and taste the soul of Jared's passion as he performs. Bold, vulnerable and genuine. Quite a moving experience
— Allen Foster, Songwriter's Monthly (February 4, 2011)

It's hard to compare Jared McCloud to any contemporary artists. And that's a good thing. Painful Words Of Loving Grace contains the intricacies and complexities of a seasoned song writer while retaining the pop-catchiness of an accessible rock record. It's clear Jared is shooting for far bigger things. And I would easily say he succeeded. 5 stars.
— John Dotson, CT/MA Music (February 3, 2011)

...a strong lyricist and a tremendous guitar player, McCloud shows a lyrical and musical ethic not dissimilar to that of a young Springsteen. He has a talent for capturing moods (NYC Song) and people (St. Catherine's Anthem) in song while holding nothing back.
— Wildy Haskell, Wildy's World (July 29, 2009)

...McCloud really shines with his new CD Romance of the Atlantic. He brings a clean pure sound with a no B.S. approach to his music that is bound to get you off your seat. To sum it up, this CD is a joy to listen to and really captures the soul. The world needs more musicians like Jared McCloud.
— Noella Tarquino, Broken Records Magazine (September 1, 2009)

McCloud's genuine feelings are reflected in "Romance of the Atlantic," and can be widely understood by any artist, or one that knows one... His innocence is refreshing, compared to others who enjoy solely the "perks" of the entertainment business (i.e. groupies and freebies)...A combination of acoustic and light rock, (Romance of the Atlantic) is smooth and soothing... McCloud seems to be directly talking to his audience in sing-song tone, making the listener feel a sense of personalization. The continual sincerity of a starving artist is felt throughout the CD
— Erika Y. Gradecki, Skope Magazine (May 26, 2009)

McCloud's arrangements bolster and color the songs in a way that sounds purposeful and tasteful, and his voice and adept acoustic guitar-playing carry the show. Jared's introspective coffeehouse pop-rock approach is mellow but not limp and his vocal delivery sounds earnest and passionate.
— Brian LaRue, New Haven Advocate (June 4, 2009)

The album title may ring of a long-lost Indiana Jones movie adventure, but the music is heartfelt folk singer-songwriter tunes that boast radio-and-pub friendly lyrics. 
— Smother Magazine (August 3, 2009)

...McCloud is as competent a guitarist as he is a lyricist. 'Colors' is a great show of his talent as a musician and as a songwriter. It's always refreshing to see an artist who truly believes in his craft. And judging by his new CD and his live show, he has a lot of reason to believe. 
— John Dotson, CTMAMusic.com (November 30, 2009)

References 
 Erika Y. Gradecki, Skope Magazine
 Wildy Haskell, Wildy's World
 John Dotson, CTMAmusic.com

External links 
 Official site

Living people
1980 births
Singer-songwriters from New York (state)
21st-century American singers
Singer-songwriters from Connecticut